Harry Windsor may refer to:

Prince Harry, Duke of Sussex (born 1984), younger son of King Charles III and Diana, Princess of Wales
Harry Windsor (surgeon) (1914–1987), Australian cardiac surgeon and mentor to Victor Chang
Harry Windsor, a fictional character from John Birmingham's Axis of Time

See also
 Henry Windsor (disambiguation)